The Macau Jockey Club (MJC; , Portuguese: Jockey Clube de Macau) is an organization providing horse racing and betting entertainment in Macau, China. MJC is one of the largest private employers of Macau with around 1,400 employees and around 1,100 part-timers.

History
The club began as the Macau Trotting Club in 1980 in an attempt to introduce harness racing in Asia, but it was not a popular sporting event and gave way to the formation of the current thoroughbred racing club in 1989.

Taipa Racecourse

The Macau Jockey Club has one track on Taipa converted from the old trotting track. The old track is now the  inner sand track and the  newer outer track is turf. The track has a grandstand seating area for 15000 spectators and Race Complex for 3000. 

The main stables at the MJC can house 1183 horses, 60 at a quarantine stable and 28 at spelling stables. The track has an equine hospital to handle minor care to surgery.

Races
 Macau Derby - July
 Macau Gold Cup - May
 The Macau Star of The Sand Stakes - June
 Macau Sprint Trophy - April
 Chairman's Challenge Cup - June
 Director's Cup

Betting

Single-Race Bets
Pool Name - Dividend Qualification

 Win (獨贏, Vencedor) - 1st in a race.
 Place (位置, Placê) - 1st, 2nd or 3rd in a race with 7 or more declared starters or 1st, 2nd in a race with 4, 5, 6 declared starters.
 Quinella (連贏, Quiniela) - 1st and 2nd in either order in the race.
 Quinella Place (位置, Exata) - Any two of the first three placed horses in any finishing order in the race.  However, the Pool will not opened when a race less than 6 starters.
 Tierce (三重彩, Trifeta) - 1st, 2nd and 3rd in correct order in the race.

Multiple-Race Bets
Pool Name - Dividend Qualification - Consolation [if any]

 Double (孖寶, Dupla) - 1st in two nominated races - 1st in 1st leg and 2nd in 2nd leg.
 Triple Trio (三T, Trio Triplo) - 1st, 2nd and 3rd in any order in three legs - 1st, 2nd and 3rd in any order in any two Triple Trio legs.

See also
Gambling in Macau
Hong Kong Jockey Club

References

External links

 Official website
 GAMES OF FORTUNE

Horse racing organizations in China
Horse racing in Macau
Gambling companies of Macau
Sports organisations of Macau
1980 establishments in Macau
Sports organizations established in 1980